Schools named Science High School include:

Located in South Korea
Ulsan Science High School, Ulsan
Changwon Science High School, Changwon
Busan Il Science High School, Busan
Busan Science High School, Busan
Chungbuk Science High School, Cheongwon

Daegu Science High School, Daegu
Daejeon Science High School, Daejeon

Gwangju Science High School, Gwangju
Gyeonggi Science High School, Suwon
Gyeonggibuk Science High School, Uijeongbu
Gyeongnam Science High School, Jinju
Gyeongsan Science High School, Gyeongsan
Hansung Science High School, Seoul
Incheon Science High School, Incheon

Jeonnam Science High School, naju
Jeonbuk Science High School, Iksan

Korea Science Academy of KAIST, Busan
Sejong Science High School, Seoul
Seoul Science High School, Jongno-gu, Seoul

Located in the Philippines

Philippine Science High School (various campuses)
Regional Science High School (various campuses)
ESEP High Schools (various public or private science high schools)

Metro Manila Science High Schools:
Caloocan City Science High School, Caloocan
Caloocan National Science and Technology High School, Caloocan
Don Alejandro Roces Sr. Science-Technology High School, Quezon City
Las Piñas City National Science High School, Las Piñas
Makati Science High School, Makati
City of Mandaluyong Science High School, Mandaluyong
Manila Science High School, Manila
Muntinlupa Science High School, Muntinlupa
Parañaque Science High School, Parañaque
Pasig City Science High School, Pasig
Quezon City Science High School, Quezon City
Ramon Magsaysay (Cubao) High School, Quezon City
Senator Renato "Compañero" Cayetano Memorial Science and Technology High School, Taguig
Taguig Science High School, Taguig
Valenzuela City School of Mathematics and Science, Valenzuela

Located in Turkey
Adana Science High School, Adana
Aksaray Science High School, Aksaray
Kültür Private Science High School, Bakırköy
Akşehir Science High School, Akşehir
Ankara Science High School, Ankara

Gaziantep Science High School, Gaziantep
Halil Kale Science High School, Turgutlu
İzmir Science High School, İzmir
Kirikkale Science High School, Kırıkkale

Malatya Science High School, Malatya

Bucak Adem Tolunay Science High School, Bucak, Burdur
Gundoğdu Private Science High School, Adana

Edirne Science High School, Edirne
Aziz Atik Science High School, Samsun

Located in the United States
Bronx High School of Science, New York City
Science Park High School (New Jersey), Newark, New Jersey